

Champions

Major League Baseball
World Series: Cleveland Indians over Boston Braves (4-2)
All-Star Game, July 13 at Sportsman's Park: American League, 5-2

Other champions
All-American Girls Professional Baseball League: Rockford Peaches
College World Series: USC
Little League World Series: Lock Haven, Pennsylvania
Negro League World Series: Homestead Grays over Birmingham Black Barons (4–1)
Negro League Baseball All-Star Game: West, 3–0
Winter Leagues
Cuban League: Leones del Habana
Mexican Pacific League: Ostioneros de Guaymas
Puerto Rican League: Leones de Ponce
Venezuelan League: Cervecería Caracas

Awards and honors
Baseball Hall of Fame
Herb Pennock
Pie Traynor
Most Valuable Player
Lou Boudreau (AL)
Stan Musial (NL)
Rookie of the Year
Alvin Dark
The Sporting News Player of the Year Award
Lou Boudreau Cleveland Indians
The Sporting News Pitcher of the Year Award
Bob Lemon Cleveland Indians
Johnny Sain Boston Braves
The Sporting News Manager of the Year Award
Billy Meyer Pittsburgh Pirates

MLB statistical leaders

Major league baseball final standings

American League final standings

National League final standings

Negro league baseball final standings

Negro American League final standings
Birmingham won the first half of the season while Kansas City won the second half.

Birmingham won the first half, Kansas City won the second half.
Birmingham beat Kansas City 3 games to 1 games in a play-off.

Negro National League final standings
This was the sixteenth and final season of the Negro National League (1933–1948). Homestead and Baltimore each won a half of the season. As such, they were matched against each other in the postseason. In the playoffs, Homestead won Games 1 and 2 before a curfew called Game 3 in the ninth inning. Game 4 went to Baltimore, but Homestead had protested that Game 3 should be played from where Game 3 had been stopped (8-4, bases loaded) rather than the start of the ninth inning (tied). The league agreed, but Baltimore refused to play and therefore forfeited.

Negro league postseason
1948 was the 23rd and final time that there was a "Playoff Series" held between black baseball teams. 1913 is retroactively the only one not in the major league era of Negro league baseball (1920-1948). 1948 is the only time that saw both the American and National League hold a postseason series to determine the pennant (Major League Baseball would not hold such a format for 21 years).

Negro American League Championship Series: Birmingham Black Barons over Kansas City Monarchs 4–3 (one tie)
Negro National League Championship Series: Homestead Grays over Baltimore Elite Giants 2–1 (one forfeit)
1948 Negro World Series: Homestead Grays over Birmingham Black Barons 4–1

Events

February
February 24 – The New York Yankees trade catcher Aaron Robinson and pitchers Bill Wight and Fred Bradley for pitcher Ed Lopat of the Chicago White Sox.
February 27 – Herb Pennock and Pie Traynor are elected to the National Baseball Hall of Fame.

March
March 30 – The Pacific Coast League integrates, as John Ritchey of the San Diego Padres pinch hits against the Los Angeles Angels.

April
April 18 :
At Yankee Stadium, 62,369 fans -the largest ever for an exhibition game-watch the Brooklyn Dodgers edge the New York Yankees, 5–3.
Before 26,663 fans at Fenway Park, the Boston Braves salvage a victory in the three-game exhibition series with the Boston Red Sox, winning 3–2 behind a solid pitching performance from Warren Spahn.
 The St. Louis Cardinals sign outfielder Joe Medwick. Medwick would be a member of the Cardinals until July of the 1948 season, when he opted to retire.
April 20 - George Vico of the Detroit Tigers hits a home run off the very first pitch he sees in the majors. In doing so, he became the fifth player in major league history to accomplish the feat. 
April 21 – Leo Durocher of the Brooklyn Dodgers returns from his one-year suspension. He uses 24 players, a new MLB record, in a 9–5 loss to the New York Giants.
April 23 – Ted Kluszewski hits the first home run of his distinguished career, a three-run shot off Pittsburgh Pirates pitcher Hal Gregg.

May
May 16 – Pete Gray, one-armed outfielder with the 1945 St. Louis Browns, starts his comeback at Class-A Elmira Pioneers.

June
June 7 The Chicago Cubs claimed Gene Mauch off waivers from the Brooklyn Dodgers
June 13 – Appearing at Yankee Stadium just nine weeks before his death, the legendary Babe Ruth is honored by the New York Yankees in an emotional pre-game ceremony and his jersey number 3 is retired. This will be the final appearance of Ruth at the Stadium, which is celebrating its 25th anniversary.
June 30 – Bob Lemon pitched a no-hitter as the Cleveland Indians defeated the Detroit Tigers, 2–0.

July
July  7 – The Cleveland Indians sign Satchel Paige, a veteran Negro league pitcher. He would be inducted into the Hall of Fame in 1971.
July 13 – At Sportsman's Park, home of the St. Louis Browns, the American League defeats the National League, 5–2, in the All-Star Game.
July 18 – Chicago White Sox left fielder Pat Seerey hits four home runs in a game against the Philadelphia Athletics, to become the fifth Major League player to do so. The White Sox win, 12–11, in 11 innings.
July 24 – Four members of the Duluth Dukes are killed when their bus is involved in an accident near St. Paul, Minnesota. The driver of the truck is also killed, and fourteen are injured. The injured list include Mel McGaha, a future major league manager in the 1960s, and the infielder Elmer Schoendienst, younger brother of the St. Louis Cardinals second baseman Red Schoendienst. The tragedy recalls the 1946 bus crash involving the Spokane Indians baseball team which took the lives of nine players.

August
August 12 – In the second game of a doubleheader, the Cleveland Indians rap out 29 hits in a 26–3 win over the St. Louis Browns. The Indians set a Major League record as 14 different players hit safely.
August 13 – Willard Brown of the St. Louis Browns becomes the first black player to homer in the American Legue, when he pinch-hits an inside-the-park home run off pitcher Hal Newhouser in a 6–5 win over the Detroit Tigers.
August 16 – Babe Ruth, arguably the greatest player in baseball history, dies from cancer in New York City at the age of 53. His open casket was placed on display in the rotunda of Yankee Stadium, where it remained for two days; 77,000 people filed past to pay him tribute.
August 21 – The 2nd Little League World Series tournament is held in Williamsport, Pennsylvania. The Lock Haven All Stars of Lock Haven, Pennsylvania defeated the St. Petersburg All Stars of St. Petersburg, Florida in the championship game, by a score of 5–4.

September
September 9 – Rex Barney of the Brooklyn Dodgers pitches a 2–0 no-hitter over the New York Giants at the Polo Grounds.
September 26 – At Braves Field, Boston Braves' Bob Elliott hits a three-run homer, as the Braves beat the New York Giants, 3–2, and clinch the Braves' first National League pennant since .

October
October   4 – The Cleveland Indians defeat the Boston Red Sox, 8–3, in an American League one-game playoff game after finishing the season tied for first place. The Indians win the pennant and advance to the World Series. The Red Sox defeat disappointed Boston fans who had been rooting the entire season for an All-Boston World Series between the AL Red Sox and the National League Braves.
October 11 – The Cleveland Indians defeat the Boston Braves, 4–3, in Game 6 of the World Series to win their second World Championship title, four games to two. In Game 4, Larry Doby became the first black player to hit a home run in the World Series. The Braves were back in the Series after a 34 year absence. This was also both the first AL pennant and WS Championship for the Indians in 28 years. To date, the Indians have yet to win another World Series.
October 12 – The New York Yankees hire Casey Stengel to be the manager beginning with the  season.

November
November 10 – The Chicago White Sox acquire young left handed pitcher Billy Pierce from the Detroit Tigers in exchange for All-Star catcher Aaron Robinson, in a move that will give them their pitching ace for the next decade. Detroit even sweetens the deal with $10,000. Pierce will win 186 games for the White Sox over the next 13 years, but Robinson will last fewer than three seasons in Detroit.
November 26 – National League president Ford Frick steps in and pays $350 for funeral services, including the cost of a coffin, for the unclaimed body of Hack Wilson. The former slugger, who had died probably of alcohol abuse a few days earlier in a Baltimore hospital, is identified only as a white male.

December
December 2 – Stan Musial of the St. Louis Cardinals is named National League Most Valuable Player. In one of the best seasons ever, Musial led the NL in batting average (.376), runs (135), RBI (131), hits (230), doubles (46), triples (18) and slugging pct. (.702).
December 3- The New York Yankees release shortstop Frankie Crosetti.

Movies
The Babe Ruth Story

Births

January
January 1 – Randy Bobb
January 5 – Charlie Hough
January 5 – Bill Laxton
January 10 – Larry Hardy
January 11 – Rick Henninger
January 11 – Glenn Redmon
January 13 – Les Cain
January 16 – Tsuneo Horiuchi
January 19 – Ken Frailing
January 22 – Fred Cambria
January 25 – Ed Goodson
January 27 – Tom Trebelhorn
January 30 – Dave Moates

February
February 6 – Doug Howard
February 10 – Jim Barr
February 10 – John Gamble
February 12 – Francisco Estrada
February 15 – Ron Cey
February 21 – Bill Slayback
February 22 – Bruce Christensen
February 22 – Tom Griffin
February 22 – Mike Rogodzinski
February 26 – Hiromitsu Kadota
February 28 – Mark Wiley

March
March 4 – Tom Grieve
March 4 – Leron Lee
March 8 – Joe Staton
March 9 – Darrel Chaney
March 9 – John Curtis
March 9 – Dan Neumeier
March 10 – Wayne Twitchell
March 11 – César Gerónimo
March 12 – Bob Watkins
March 13 – Steve Barber
March 19 – Paul Powell
March 20 – Chuck Seelbach
March 22 – Jake Brown
March 22 – Carlos Velázquez
March 25 – Mike Nagy

April
April 1 – Willie Montañez
April 4 – Leon Hooten
April 7 – Rick Sawyer
April 10 – Lee Lacy
April 18 – Ron Schueler
April 19 – Rick Miller
April 24 – Bob Beall
April 28 – Pablo Torrealba
April 30 – Mike Barlow

May
May 1 – Von Joshua
May 2 – Larry Gowell
May 6 – Frankie Librán
May 7 – Ken Hottman
May 8 – Steve Braun
May 8 – Miguel Puente
May 14 – Dave LaRoche
May 15 – Yutaka Enatsu
May 15 – Billy North
May 17 – Carlos May
May 19 – Al Santorini
May 23 – Reggie Cleveland
May 24 – Hideji Kato
May 26 – Bob Hansen
May 27 – Gary Nolan

June
June 2 – Joe Pactwa
June 5 – Mark Schaeffer
June 10 – Bob Randall
June 11 – Dave Cash
June 16 – Ron LeFlore
June 17 – Dave Concepción
June 17 – Gary Ryerson
June 25 – Clay Kirby

July
July 3 – Phil Meeler
July 4 – Ed Armbrister
July 4 – Wayne Nordhagen
July 5 – Dave Lemonds
July 7 – Bob Gallagher
July 7 – Tommy Moore
July 8 – Lerrin LaGrow
July 10 – Rich Hand
July 13 – Rob Belloir
July 14 – Pepe Frías
July 14 – Earl Williams
July 21 – John Hart
July 22 – Jesse Hudson
July 24 – Mike Adams
July 26 – John Knox
July 29 – Hisashi Yamada

August
August 1 – Tommy Smith
August 4 – Johnny Grubb
August 9 – Bill Campbell
August 9 – Gary Timberlake
August 13 – Erskine Thomason
August 16 – Mike Jorgensen
August 17 – Bill Parsons
August 19 – John Boles
August 21 – John Ellis
August 21 – Craig Robinson
August 23 – Ron Blomberg
August 27 – Lew Beasley
August 30 – Steve Simpson

September
September 1 – Dick Lange
September 11 – Jeff Newman
September 18 – Ken Brett (d. 2003)
September 18 – Lee Richard
September 21 – Gary Lance
September 21 – Aurelio López (d. 1992)
September 24 – Eric Soderholm
September 25 – Ray Busse
September 27 – Carlos López
September 30 – Craig Kusick
September 30 – Rusty Torres

October
October 1 – Bill Bonham
October 4 – Dave Johnson
October 8 – Rick Stelmaszek
October 8 – Bernie Williams
October 13 – Randy Moffitt
October 14 – Ed Figueroa
October 14 – Brent Strom
October 19 – Rimp Lanier
October 21 – Bill Russell
October 26 – Toby Harrah
October 31 – Mickey Rivers

November
November 3 – Rick Kreuger
November 3 – Ed Montague
November 7 – Buck Martinez
November 7 – Tom Walker
November 16 – Don Hahn
November 24 – Steve Yeager

December
December 1 – George Foster
December 2 – Wayne Simpson
December 5 – Buddy Harris
December 9 – Doc Medich
December 11 – Gene Hiser
December 14 – Ralph Garcia
December 15 – Doug Rau
December 20 – Jim Norris
December 21 – Dave Kingman
December 22 – Steve Garvey
December 23 – Alec Distaso
December 26 – Chris Chambliss
December 26 – Dave Rader

Deaths

January
January   4 – Biff Schlitzer, 63, who pitched from 1908 through 1914 for the Philadelphia Athletics, Boston Red Sox and Buffalo Blues.
January   8 – Howdy Caton, 53, shortstop for the Pittsburgh Pirates over parts of four seasons from 1917–1920.
January   9 – Art Jahn, 52, part-time  outfielder who played for the Chicago Cubs, New York Giants and Philadelphia Phillies during two seasons spanning 1925 to 1928.
January 14 – Art Benedict, 85, second baseman who appeared in three games with the Philadelphia Quakers in 1883. 
January 23 – Frank Doljack, 40, outfielder who played for the Detroit Tigers from 1930 through 1934 and the  Cleveland Indians in 1943. 
January 30 – Herb Pennock, 53, Hall of Fame pitcher for the Philadelphia Athletics, Boston Red Sox and New York Yankees in a span of 22 seasons from 1912–1934, who during his career posted a lifetime record of 240–161 with a 3.60 ERA in 617 games; collected a perfect 5–0 with a 1.95 ERA in five World Series trips with the Yankees, including their first World Series championship; general manager of Philadelphia Phillies from 1944 until his death.
January 31 – Clarence Lehr, 61, who  played some outfield and infield utility positions with the Philadelphia Phillies in 1911.

February
February   1 – Jim McCormick, 79, infielder who played three games for the National League St. Louis Browns in 1892.  
February 10 – Bill Clancy, 68, first baseman for the 1905 Pittsburgh Pirates.
February 14 – Mordecai Brown, 71, Hall of Fame pitcher whose loss of two fingers in a childhood accident gave him remarkable movement on pitches, winning 20 games six straight years for the Chicago Cubs, while posting a career record of 239–130 with a 2.06 earned run average; the third best ERA in Major League Baseball history amongst pitchers inducted into the Hall of Fame, as well as the best in MLB history for any pitcher with more than 200 wins.
February 16 – Percy Coleman, 71, pitcher who played from 1897 to 1898 for the St. Louis Browns and Cincinnati Reds.
February 19 – Bob Groom, 63, pitcher for the Washington Senators, St. Louis Terriers, St. Louis Browns and Cleveland Indians during 10 seasons from 1909 to 1918, who also hurled a no-hitter in 1917 against the eventual World Champion Chicago White Sox.
February 21 – Irv Ray, 84, shortstop who played with the Boston Beaneaters of the National League in 1888 and 1889, and the Baltimore Orioles of the American Association from 1889 to 1891.

March
March   1 – Rebel Oakes, 64, center fielder who played from 1909 through 1913 with the Cincinnati Reds and St. Louis Cardinals, and later served as a player-manager for the Pittsburgh Rebels of the outlaw Federal League in the 1914 and 1915 seasons.
March 10 – Stub Brown, 77, pitcher for the Baltimore Orioles from 1893 to 1894 and the Cincinnati Reds in 1897.
March 17 – Ike Butler, 74, pitcher for the 1902 Baltimore Orioles. 
March 18 – Fritz Von Kolnitz, 54, third baseman who played for the Cincinnati Reds from 1914 to 1915 and the Chicago White Sox in 1916. 
March 23 – Dutch Meier, 68, outfielder and shortstop who played for the Pittsburgh Pirates in 1906.
March 24 – Jimmy Bannon, 76, outfielder for the St. Louis Browns in 1893 and the Boston Beaneaters from 1894 to 1896.
March 30 – Charlie Krause, 76, second baseman for the 1901 Cincinnati Reds.

April
April   1 – Heinie Jantzen, 57, outfielder for the 1912 St. Louis Browns.
April   3 – Candy Jim Taylor, 64, Negro league baseball third baseman and manager.
April 16 – Dick Kauffman, 59, first baseman who played for the St. Louis Browns in the 1914 and 1915 seasons.
April 17 – Pat Deisel, catcher for the 1902 Brooklyn Superbas and the 1903 Cincinnati Reds. 
April 25 – Bertrum Hunter, 42, Negro league baseball player.
April 27 – Ad Yale, 78, who appeared in four games with the Brooklyn Superbas in the 1905 season.

May
May   2 – Dick Cogan, 76, two-way player for the Baltimore Orioles, Chicago Orphans and New York Giants over part of three seasons spanning 1897–1900.
May   4 – John Dolan, 80, pitcher who played for the Cincinnati Reds, Columbus Solons, Washington Senators, St. Louis Browns and Chicago Colts in a span of five seasons between 1890 and 1895.
May   7 – Hi Ladd, 78, backup outfielder for the Pittsburgh Pirates and Boston Beaneaters in the 1898 season.  
May 18 – Frank Schneiberg, 68, pitcher for the 1910 Brooklyn Superbas.
May 19 – Frank Browning, 65, pitcher for the Detroit Tigers in its 1910 season.
May 26 – Bill Sweeney, 62,  valuable middle infielder and third baseman whose seven year career was marked by frequent moves between two cities, playing from 1907 to 1913 for the Chicago Cubs and the  Boston Doves, Rustlers and Braves clubs before rejoining the Cubs in 1914, setting a National League record in 1912  with 425 putouts by a second baseman that would stand for twenty-one years, even without a regular shortstop partner, while also leading the NL both in assists (475) and double plays (75).

June
June   5 – Jack McCarthy, 78, left fielder who played for five teams in 12 seasons between 1893 and 1907, whose career batting average of .287 in 1,092 games was achieved during the hard hitting era of the late 1890s and the dead-ball era of the early 1900s, as his .321 average with the Cleveland Blues in 1901 was ninth best in the American League.
June 10 – Hosea Siner, 63, backup infielder for the 1909 Boston Doves.
June 12 – Rasty Wright, 52, pitcher who played for the St. Louis Browns in part of five seasons between 1917 and 1923.
June 26 – Jimmy Esmond, 58, shortstop who played from 1911 to 1912 with the Cincinnati Reds, and for the Indianapolis Hoosiers and Newark Peppers of the outlaw Federal League in a span of two seasons from 1914–1915.

July
July   1 – Pete Knisely, 60, outfielder who played for the Cincinnati Reds and Chicago Cubs over parts of four seasons from 1912 to 1915.
July   3 – Charles Witherow, 96, pitcher who appeared in just one game for the Washington Nationals in 1875.  
July   5 – Ed Smith, 84, Canadian pitcher who played in 1884 for the Baltimore Monumentals of the Union Association.  
July 11 – Bert Hall, 58, for the 1911 Philadelphia Phillies.
July 18 – Chick Hartley, 67, outfielder who played for the New York Giants in the 1902 season.
July 19 – Charlie See, 51, outfielder who played from 1919 through 1921 for the Cincinnati Reds.
July 26 – Homer Davidson, 63, catcher and right fielder who appeared in four games for the Cleveland Naps in 1914.
July 27 – Joe Tinker, 68, Hall of Fame shortstop who along second baseman Johnny Evers and first baseman Frank Chance anchored a famed infield double play combination, which is memorialized in the legendary poem Baseball's Sad Lexicon, as the trio led the Chicago Cubs during the glory years of 1906–1910 to four National League pennants and two World Series titles.
July 29 – Arnie Stone, 55, pitcher for the Pittsburgh Pirates in the 1923 and 1924 seasons.

August
August   7 – Jimmy Wacker, 64, pitcher who played with the Pittsburgh Pirates in the 1909 season. 
August   9 – Chick Bowen, 51, backup outfielder for the 1919  New York Giants.
August   9 – Harry Lord, 66, third baseman who played from 1907 through 1910 for the Boston Americans and Red Sox, before joining the Chicago White Sox from 1910 to 1914 and the Buffalo Blues in 1915. 
August 12 – Billy Graulich, 80, catcher and first baseman who played for the Philadelphia Phillies in its 1891 season.
August 13 – Nig Perrine, 63, backup infielder for the 1907 Washington Senators.
August 14 – Phil Collins, 46, pitcher who posted an 80–85 (4.66) record in 292 games for the Chicago Cubs, Philadelphia Phillies and St. Louis Cardinals over eight seasons between 1923 and 1935; his home park for most of his career was Baker Bowl, a notorious batter-friendly stadium in the lively ball era.
August 16 – Babe Ruth, 53, Hall of Fame right fielder and pitcher, who is considered the greatest star in baseball history, while holding records for most home runs in a season (60) and lifetime (714), as well as most career RBI (2,213); lifetime .342 hitter also posted a 94-46 record and 2.28 ERA as a pitcher while playing for seven champions; won 1923 MVP award, at a time when AL rules prohibited winning it more than once.
August 19 – Fred Odwell, 75, outfielder for the Cincinnati Reds during four seasons from 1904 to 1907, who led the National league in home runs in 1905.
August 20 – Walter Blair, 64, catcher for the New York Highlanders from 1907 through 1911, who later played and managed for the Buffalo Buffeds/Blues of the Federal League during their only two seasons in 1914 and 1915.
August 26 – Rip Cannell, 68, outfielder who played from 1904 to 1905 for the Boston Beaneaters of the National League. 
August 29 – Charlie Graham, 70, catcher for the 1906 Boston Red Sox, before becoming manager and owner of the PCL San Francisco Seals.

September
September   3 – Bert Husting, 60, two-star athlete in the 1890s University of Wisconsin teams, who later pitched in the majors for the Pittsburgh Pirates, Milwaukee Brewers, Boston Americans and Philadelphia Athletics from 1900 to 1902.
September   8 – Bill Byers, 70, backup catcher for the 1904 St. Louis Cardinals.
September 18 – Art Devlin, 68, third baseman who played from 1904 through 1911 with the New York Giants and the Boston Braves from 1912 to 1913, also a member of the  1905 World Series champion team. 
September 23 – Rich Durning, 55, pitcher for the Brooklyn Robins from 1917 to 1918.
September 26 – Elmer Leifer, 55, who made 10 appearances as a pinch hitter with the Chicago White Sox in 1921.

October
October   1 – Lew Camp, 80, 19th-century Major League Baseball infielder who played with the St. Louis Browns in 1892 and for the Chicago Colts from 1893 to 1894.
October   7 – Doc Imlay, 59, pitcher for the 1913 Philadelphia Phillies.
October   8 – Al Orth, 76, softly thrower but curveball specialist, who pitched with the Philadelphia Phillies, Washington Senators and New York Highlanders in a span of 15 seasons from 1895–1909, winning 204 games for them, yet struck out just 948 batters in 3,354 innings of work, while remaining an effective pitcher during the early years of the American League, posting career season-highs with 27 wins and 133 strikeouts for the Highlanders in 1906.
October 12 – Bill Gardner, 82, pitcher who played three games for the Baltimore Orioles of the American Association in 1887.
October 20 – Ed Kusel, 62, pitcher for the 1909 St. Louis Browns.
October 24 – Harry Grabiner, 57, minority owner and vice president of the Cleveland Indians since 1946; previously served for 30 years (1915–1945) in the front office of the Chicago White Sox.
October 24 – Jack Thoney, 68, well-traveled outfielder and infielder who played from 1902 through 1911 for the Cleveland Bronchos, Baltimore Orioles, Washington Senators, New York Highlanders and Boston Red Sox.
October 28 – Roy Ellam, 62, shortstop who played with the Cincinnati Reds in the 1909 season and for the Pittsburgh Pirates in 1918.
October 31 – Dick Redding, 58, star pitcher of the Negro leagues who set numerous strikeout records and pitched several no-hitters.

November
November   1 – Fred Mollenkamp, 58,  first baseman who played for the Philadelphia Phillies in the 1914 season.
November   4 – Jake Powell, 40, outfielder for the Washington Senators, New York Yankees and Philadelphia Phillies in a span of 11 seasons from 1930 to 1945, who helped the Yankees win the World Series every year from 1936 to 1939, and hit a .455 average in the 1936 series. 
November   7 – Jake Smith, 61, pitcher who appeared in two games for the Philadelphia Phillies during the 1911 season. 
November 15 – Joe Wagner, 59, second baseman for the Cincinnati Reds in the 1915 season. 
November 18 – Joe Regan, 76, outfielder for the 1898 New York Giants.
November 22 – Bob Emmerich, 57, center fielder for the Boston Braves in the 1923 season.
November 23 – Hack Wilson, 48, Hall of Fame center fielder for four different clubs during 12 seasons from !923–1934, most prominently with the Chicago Cubs between 1926 and 1931, who finished his career with a lifetime .307 batting average, 244 home runs, 1,063 RBI and four home run titles, hitting 56 long balls in 1930, to set a National League record that stood for 68 years, while driving in 191 runs in the same season, which still the all-time major league record.
November 30 – Frank Bowerman, 79, catcher and battery-mate for Christy Mathewson on the New York Giants, who also played for the Baltimore Orioles and Pittsburgh Pirates, and later managed the 1909 Boston Doves.

December
December   3 – Gus Bono, 54, pitcher for the 1920 Washington Senators.
December   3 – Fred Buckingham, 72, pitcher who played for the Washington Senators in its 1895 season.
December   6 – Bill Dammann, 76, pitcher who played from 1897 through 1899 for the Cincinnati Reds.
December   8 – Pelham Ballenger, 54, third baseman for the Washington Senators in the 1928 season.
December 26 – Joe Pate, 56, pitcher for the Philadelphia Athletics over parts of two seasons from 1926–1927.
December 27 – Marv Peasley, 60, pitcher who appeared in two games for the Detroit Tigers in 1910. 
December 29 – Larry Hoffman, 70, third baseman for the 1901 Chicago Orphans.

Sources

External links

Baseball Reference – 1948 MLB Season Summary
Baseball Reference – MLB Players born in 1948
Baseball Reference – MLB Players died in 1948